Kailash Prakash  was an Indian politician. He was elected to the Lok Sabha, the lower house of the Parliament of India from the Meerut constituency of Uttar Pradesh as a member of the Janata Party.

References

External links
  Official biographical sketch in Parliament of India website

1908 births
Janata Party politicians
Lok Sabha members from Uttar Pradesh
India MPs 1977–1979